The Horch 10 M 20 is a car that was brought to the market in 1922 by the Horch company in Zwickau. The construction was made by Arnold Zoller from Argus Motoren in Berlin. Their owner Moritz Straus held in the early 1920s, the majority of the shares of the Horch company.

The vehicle had a front-mounted 4-cylinder inline engine with flathead engine and 1.6 liters capacity. He developed 35 hp at 2000/min. The rear wheels were driven over a 4-speed gearbox with shift lever in the center of the car. The car with U-profile frame had leaf-sprung rigid axles and was as four-seater touring car or city-coupe available.

Facelift
In July 1923 Paul Daimler became chief designer at Argus and revised the engine. He constructed a valve train overhead camshaft that was driven by a Königswelle (master shaft). With these changes the engine gave 50 hp at 2800/min. The carriage from 1924 offered called Horch 10 M 25, was the first German car with four-wheel brakes and was delivered only with six seats. Until 1926 originated about 2300 pieces.

Technical data

Models
 T4 = 4-seats Touring car
 T6 = 6-seats Touring car
 L4 = 4-doors Sedan
 PL4 = 4-doors Pullman-Sedan
 Cp4 = 4-doors Town-Coupé
 Cb4 = 4-doors Coupé-Convertible

References

Executive cars
Cars of Germany
Sedans
Convertibles